James Daly ( – 1769) was an Irish Member of Parliament.

In 1741 he was elected to the Irish House of Commons for Athenry, and then in 1768 for the borough of Galway.

He was son of Denis Daly of Carrownakelly, County Galway, and grandson of Denis Daly, a judge of the Court of Common Pleas (Ireland). He was married firstly to Bridget, daughter of Francis Bermingham, 14th Baron Athenry and Lady Mary Nugent, and secondly to Catherine, daughter of Sir Ralph Gore, 4th Baronet and his second wife Elizabeth Ashe. His children by his second wife included St George Daly, later a judge, and the politician Denis Daly, father of James Daly, 1st Baron Dunsandle and Clanconal.

References
 https://web.archive.org/web/20090601105535/http://www.leighrayment.com/commons/irelandcommons.htm
 http://thepeerage.com/p23360.htm#i233595

Ball, F. Elrington "The Judges in Ireland 1221-1921" London John Murray 1926

1710s births
1769 deaths
Irish MPs 1727–1760
Irish MPs 1761–1768
Irish MPs 1769–1776
Members of the Parliament of Ireland (pre-1801) for County Galway constituencies